HMS Revenge (S27) was the fourth of the Royal Navy's  ballistic missile submarines.

Construction
The four Resolution-class submarines were ordered on 8 May 1963, with Revenge, the fourth of the class, laid down at Cammell Laird's Birkenhead shipyard on 19 May 1965. Construction of the two submarines being built at Lairds (Revenge and ) was much slower than planned, with poor performance by Cammell Laird and in particular its workers to blame. At one stage the Ministry of Defence considered towing the unfinished submarines to Barrow-in-Furness for completion by Vickers-Armstrongs.  Revenge was launched on 15 March 1968. She was formally commissioned on 4 December 1969.

Design
Displacement was  surfaced and  submerged. A  diesel engine provided auxiliary power.

Sixteen tubes for Polaris A3 Submarine-launched ballistic missiles were carried, in two rows of eight. Defensive armament consisted of six  torpedo tubes. The ship had a complement of 143 (13 officers and 130 other ranks), with two separate crews in order to maximise time at sea.

Service
Following commissioning, Revenge underwent extensive sea trials and work-up, before sailing to the United States to carry out a test firing of a Polaris missile at the Eastern Test Range off Florida in June 1970.

She was marked for disposal in 1992. She is currently being stored pending the identification of a disposal solution for all of the UK's decommissioned nuclear submarines, at Rosyth Dockyard, on the northern shore of the Firth of Forth. She is docked down for maintenance and re-preservation approximately every 12 years.

Notes

References

Sources

External links 
 HMS Revenge on battleships-cruisers.co.uk
 Ron's Submarine's Covers entry for Revenge

 

Resolution-class submarines
Ships built on the River Mersey
1968 ships
Cold War submarines of the United Kingdom